Benito James Martinez (born June 28, 1971) is an American actor, best known for his role as LAPD Captain David Aceveda in the FX police drama The Shield, Luis Torres in Sons of Anarchy (2011-2012), Todd Denver in How to Get Away with Murder (2016-2018), Sheriff Diaz in 13 Reasons Why (2019-2020), and for his film role in the movie My Family (1995) and Kill Your Darlings (2006).

Early life
Martinez was born in Albuquerque, New Mexico on June 28, 1971, the son of Margarita Martinez-Cannon. He attended Hollywood High School Performing Arts Center, along with Anthony Anderson. After graduating high school, he went to study at the London Academy of Music and Dramatic Art, where his sister also studied. Besides Martinez, Kim Cattrall, Donald Sutherland and Chiwetel Ejiofor also studied there.

Career
He returned to the United States and moved to Los Angeles, where he appeared as Fernandez in an episode of The Bronx Zoo, "The Gospel Truth".

He has worked in films such as Saw, Million Dollar Baby, End Game and The Dry Land. From 2015 to 2017, Martinez appeared as three different characters, Alonzo Gutierrez, Dominic Calderone and Luis Salazar in the crime drama television series American Crime for 17 episodes.

In animation and video games, he voices Lonestar in ¡Mucha Lucha!, Horatio Hidalgo in What's New, Scooby-Doo?, Coyote Smith in Killer7, Manuel Noriega in Call of Duty: Black Ops III and Captain Julian Dawes in Battlefield Hardline.

In 2017, Martinez played Jose Menendez in the Lifetime original movie Menendez: Blood Brothers, and appeared as James Rangel in the autobiographical drama film American Made, featuring Tom Cruise, Domhnall Gleeson, Sarah Wright, Jayma Mays, Jesse Plemons and Alejandro Edda.

In 2021, Martinez played Texas Ranger Major Gabriel Reyes in the FOX TV show 9-1-1: Lone Star.  His character is the father of Austin Police Officer Carlos Reyes.

Personal life
He is the brother of the late actress Patrice Martinez.

Filmography

Film

Television

Television films

Video games

References

External links

1971 births
Living people
20th-century American male actors
21st-century American male actors
Male actors from Albuquerque, New Mexico
Alumni of the London Academy of Music and Dramatic Art
American male film actors
American male television actors
American male voice actors
American people of Guatemalan descent
Male actors from New Mexico